Ranjini Haridas is an Indian television presenter, actress, model and YouTuber . She became popular through the Star Singer TV show of Asianet.Throughout 5 seasons of the show, she was the host.

She reacted against the cruelty to animals, specifically to street dogs in Kerala. She responded that 'Humanity is dead' when a woman set fire on a dog & 7 puppies at Kochi, Kerala.

Career

Hosting career 
Ranjini Haridas went to London for her higher studies. On her return, she ventured into compering and found it lucrative. Since then she has hosted several stage shows such as Asianet Film Awards, Amrita TV Film Awards, Asiavision Awards, Flowers TV awards, Jaihind Film Awards and SIIMA. Ranjini was crowned Miss Kerala at Femina Miss Kerala - 2000.

Film appearances 
Her first recognized film appearance was for a cameo roles in China Town and Thalsamayam Oru Penkutty (2013). Later she played as a police officer in the film Entry (2013) opposite Baburaj, it was her first leading role. Since 2015 she has been an integral part of Flower TV both in program management and TV hosting. She hosted the Star Singer program on Asianet TV from 2007 to 2012. In 2017 she returned to Asianet with Run Baby Run, a revamped celebrity interview  She was a participant in Bigg Boss Malayalam (season 1).

Television

Filmography

Films

Controversies
She was openly criticised by veteran actor Jagathy Sreekumar for overstepping her boundaries as an anchor in the singing contest Star Singer.  There were allegations from contestants that she was doing so to influence judges in favour of certain contestants. Ranjini openly spoke about his verbal tirade and pointed out towards the inherent sexism in the Malayalam industry. She was shamed by a mob for her alleged use of unparliamentary words and physical attack on a passenger who grazed her in a jammed airport, for this she later responded the community was led by misogynists. A similar incident happened when a passenger created ruckus when he alleged that she tried to bypass queue in Airport in an attempt to use special privileges, both the parties registered cases against each other for abusive verbal attack.

Ranjini appeared in an interview with Ranjini Jose for Grihalakshmi Magazine. On Friendship Day, they spoke about how good friendships are interpreted as lesbian relationship in Kerala.

References

Living people
Year of birth missing (living people)
20th-century Indian actresses
21st-century Indian actresses
Actresses from Kochi
Actresses in Malayalam cinema
Actresses in Malayalam television
Female models from Kerala
Indian film actresses
Indian television actresses
Indian television presenters
Indian women television presenters
Bigg Boss Malayalam contestants
Child actresses in Malayalam cinema
St. Teresa's College alumni